Pietro Emo, C.R. (1573–1629) was a Roman Catholic prelate who served as Bishop of Crema (1616–1629) and Titular Bishop of Larissa in Syria (1612–1616).

Biography
Pietro Emo was born in Venice, Italy in 1573 and ordained a priest in the Congregation of Clerics Regular of the Divine Providence in 1592.
On 4 Jul 1612, he was appointed during the papacy of Pope Paul V as Titular Bishop of Larissa in Syria and Coadjutor Bishop of Crema.
On 8 Jul 1612, he was consecrated bishop by Giovanni Delfino (camerlengo), Cardinal-Priest of San Marco, with Attilio Amalteo, Titular Archbishop of Athenae, and Giovanni Battista del Tufo, Bishop Emeritus of Acerra, serving as co-consecrators. 
On 6 Jun 1616, he succeeded to the bishopric.
He served as Bishop of Crema until his death on 28 Sep 1629.

References

External links and additional sources
 (for Chronology of Bishops) 
 (for Chronology of Bishops) 
 (for Chronology of Bishops) 
 (for Chronology of Bishops) 

17th-century Italian Roman Catholic bishops
Bishops appointed by Pope Paul V
1573 births
1629 deaths
Theatine bishops